Ovaköy is a village in the Silopi district of Şırnak Province in Turkey. The village had a population of 52 in 2021.

The hamlet of Onurlu is attached to Esenli.

References 

Villages in Silopi District
Kurdish settlements in Şırnak Province